Rita Eleanor Hauser (born July 12, 1934 in New York) is an international lawyer known for persuading Yasser Arafat and the Palestine Liberation Organization to renounce violence in 1988.  She also served as United States Ambassador to the United Nations Commission on Human Rights from 1969 to 1972.  George W. Bush appointed her to the President's Intelligence Advisory Board  in 2001, serving through 2004, and she was appointed again by Barack Obama in 2009.

Biography
Born of Jewish parents, Hauser was the elder of two daughters of Nathan and Frieda (Litt) Abrams, Rita Eleanor (Abrams).

In 1954 she received a B.A. from Hunter College in New York, after which she was awarded a Fulbright scholarship for graduate work in France, which eventually resulted in receiving a doctorate in political economy from the University of Strasbourg.  She attended Harvard Law School for a while, then received a license en droit from the University of Paris (a rarity for an American) in 1958, then later received an LL.B. in 1959 from the New York University School of Law.

Hauser served as co-chair of "New Yorkers for Nixon" during Richard Nixon’s successful 1968 presidential campaign. She then became the United States representative to the United Nations Commission on Human Rights (1969–1972). She also served as a member of the United States delegation to the twenty-fourth UN General Assembly.

During her time at the UN that she met many key players in Middle East politics and became committed to her pursuit of conflict resolution in the Middle East, human rights and humanitarian law. During her term at the UN, she helped Jewish immigrants leave Russia and visited Palestinian refugee camps throughout the Middle East.

During this period she also met Golda Meir who soon became her mentor and role model. Meir inspired Hauser’s involvement in Middle East politics and encouraged her, a secular Jew, to learn more about Jewish history and her own Jewishness.

For more than twenty years, Hauser was a senior partner at Stroock & Stroock & Lavan in New York.

She also serves as an Advisory Board member for the Partnership for a Secure America.

She and her husband established the Hauser Center for Nonprofit Organizations at Harvard Kennedy School of Government, and she is Co-Chair of the Dean’s Advisory Board at Harvard Law School, and the Hausers also were the principal benefactors of the Hauser Global Law School Program at New York University School of Law.

A self-described Rockefeller Republican, Hauser supported Barack Obama in the 2008 United States presidential election.

References

1934 births
20th-century American Jews
Fellows of the American Academy of Arts and Sciences
Harvard Law School alumni
Hunter College alumni
Living people
New York (state) lawyers
New York University School of Law alumni
Representatives of the United States to the United Nations Human Rights Council
University of Strasbourg alumni
University of Paris alumni
American women ambassadors
21st-century American Jews
20th-century American women
21st-century American women